Systenus is a genus of fly in the family Dolichopodidae.

Species

Systenus africanus Grichanov in Grichanov & Mostovski, 2009
Systenus albimanus Wirth, 1952
Systenus amazonicus Naglis, 2000
Systenus apicalis Wirth, 1952
Systenus australis Bickel, 1986
Systenus bartaki Naglis, 2017
Systenus beatae Naglis, 2000
Systenus bipartitus (Loew, 1850)
Systenus californicus Harmston, 1968
Systenus curryi Bickel, 1986
Systenus divericatus Bickel, 2015
Systenus eboritibia Bickel, 2015
Systenus emusorum Bickel, 2015
Systenus eucercus Steyskal, 1970
Systenus flaviatus Naglis, 2000
Systenus flavifemoratus Bickel, 2015
Systenus flavimaculatus Negrobov, 2005
Systenus ladonnae Runyon, 2020
Systenus leucurus Loew, 1859
Systenus maculipennis Bickel, 2015
Systenus mallochi MacGowan, 1997
Systenus minutus (Van Duzee, 1913)
Systenus naranjensis Bickel, 2015
Systenus nigriatus Naglis, 2000
Systenus oregonensis Harmston & Miller, 1966
Systenus pallipes (von Roser, 1840)
Systenus parkeri Bickel, 2015
†Systenus penicillatus Meunier, 1907
Systenus rafaeli Naglis, 2000
Systenus raptor Becker, 1922
Systenus rarus Naglis, 2000
Systenus sachalinensis Negrobov & Shamshev, 1985
Systenus scholtzi (Loew, 1850)
Systenus shannoni Wirth, 1952
Systenus sinensis Yang & Gaimari, 2004
Systenus slovaki Olejnicek & Kozanek, 1997
Systenus slovakiensis Negrobov, Manko & Oboňa, 2020
Systenus tener Loew, 1859
Systenus tenorio Bickel, 2015
Systenus utahensis Harmston & Miller, 1966
Systenus vasilii Grichanov, 2002
Systenus zurqui Bickel, 2015

Unplaced species in Dolichopodidae:
 †Systenus ciliatus Meunier, 1907

Synonyms:
Systenus alpinus Vaillant, 1978: Synonym of Systenus scholtzi (Loew, 1850)
Systenus americanus Van Duzee, 1914: Synonym of Rhaphium melampus (Loew, 1861)
Systenus lamelliger Muller, 1924: Synonym of Sybistroma inornatus (Loew, 1857)
Systenus obscurior Becker, 1918: Synonym of Sybistroma inornatus (Loew, 1857)
Systenus ornatus Mik, 1866: Synonym of Oncopygius distans (Loew, 1857)
Systenus pallidus Vaillant, 1978: Synonym of Systenus pallipes (von Roser, 1840)

References

Dolichopodidae genera
Medeterinae
Taxa named by Hermann Loew